Coelioxys minuta is a species of leaf-cutting bee in the genus Coelioxys, of the family Megachilidae. It is found in India, and recordings from Sri Lanka is uncertain.

References

minuta
Hymenoptera of Asia
Insects of India
Insects described in 1879